The second competition weekend of the 2018–19 ISU Speed Skating World Cup was held at the Tomakomai Highland Sport Center in Tomakomai, Japan, from Friday, 23 November, until Sunday, 25 November 2018.

Schedule
The detailed event schedule:

Medal summary

Men's events

 In mass start, race points are accumulated during the race based on results of the intermediate sprints and the final sprint. The skater with most race points is the winner.

Women's events

 In mass start, race points are accumulated during the race based on results of the intermediate sprints and the final sprint. The skater with most race points is the winner.

References

2
ISU World Cup, 2018-19, 1
Sport in Hokkaido
2018 in Japanese sport